Idhayathai Thirudathey ( Don't steal the heart) is an Indian Tamil-language series airing on Colors Tamil. It premiered on 14 February 2020 and last aired on 3 June 2022. The show stars Navin Kumar and Bindhu Hima. The show is the official remake of Marathi Serial Jeev Zala Yeda Pisa airing on Colors Marathi.

Sahana (Hima Bindhu) and Shiva (Navin Kumar) marry due to political war triggered by them. But Sahana and Shiva start to understand each other. But problems arise from Shiva's mother and MLA who Shiva is working for, and ex MLA. In August 2021, a 6-year leap was introduced where several new characters were introduced. These included Sahana and Shiva's daughter; Aishwarya Jr. The series was ended with 1097 episodes on 3 June 2022.

Introduction
It is an enemies to lovers romance of Shiva and Sahana. Initially, they don't like each other, but they are forced to get married due to family and political pressure.

Shiva is a goon-like man. He isn't well educated. Sahana is a well educated, disciplined and stands for the right thing. 
After certain events, Shiva and Sahana come to understand and love each other, but Bhavani (Shiva's mother) and MLA Dakshayani who Shiva is working for plots to break them up constantly .

Plot

Season 1 

Sahana, a bride-to-be, notices her friend being beaten up by Shiva, the handyman of the local politician, Dakshayani. Shiva's act leaves Sahana fuming with rage.  
Later, Sahana witnesses yet another disrespectful and foul behavior of Shiva towards a young woman. After witnessing the incident of Shiva, Sahana gets distraught. Sahana decides to speak up against the injustice and gives her statement against Shiva to the police. However, oblivious to the fact that while she testified against him, Shiva manages to identify her despite her disguise. Planning on teaching Sahana a lesson, Shiva kidnapped Sahana. Sahana's wedding comes to a shocking halt when the family discovers that she is nowhere to be found. While Sahana's family faces humiliation, Sahana's wedding gets called off. Shiva releases Sahana after keeping her in captivity as an act of revenge. Getting humiliated by Vanavarayan, Dakshayani asks Sahana's parents to get Sahana married to Shiva. At first, Shiva and Sahana refrained but were compelled to agree. Sahana and Shiva exchange vows and promise to be with each other, with rage and revenge in the heart. After their wedding, initially, they both hated each other but the days go by Sahana and Shiva have a strong connection building up between them.

Season 2
Six years later
This the story of Sahana,Shiva and their daughter Aishwarya. Some issues because of Dakshayani, Shiva and Sahana break their relationship. 
Then, Aiswarya Jr. (Shiva and Sahana's daughter) is under Sahana's custody. One day, Aishwarya gets kidnapped by goons and when she try to escape, she ended up in Shiva's car. Later, Shiva handle's Aishu to police and she meets her mother. 
Aishu told Sahana about how King take care of her. Aishu invites King to her birthday party.  At the function, Sahana and Shiva meets for the first time after six years. Shiva get knows that Aishu is his daughter.

Cast

Main 
 Hima Bindhu as Sahana "Raangi" Somasundaram Shiva – A businesswoman; Somasundaram and Devagi's daughter; Elangovan's sister; Shiva's wife; Jr. Aishwarya's mother
 Navin Kumar as Shiva "Rowdy Singam" Neelakandan – A local gangster; Neelakandan and Bhavani's son; Aishwarya's brother; Sahana's husband; Jr. Aishwarya's father 
 Baby Aazhiya as Jr. Aishwarya "Aishu" Shiva – Shiva and Sahana's daughter

Supporting

 Riya Madona / Lavanya Manickam / Nithya Raj as Aishwarya "Aishu" Neelakandan – Neelakandan and Bhavani's daughter; Shiva's sister (Dead)
 B. Nilani as Dakshayani – Shiva's arch-rival; Sethupathi's mother; Aishwarya's murderer
 Sam as Sethupathi aka Sethu – Dakshayani's son; Shiva's rival; Aishwarya's murderer
 Ilavarasan / Ashok as Neelakandan – Godhandapani's brother; Bhavani's husband; Shiva and Aishwarya's father; Jr. Aishwarya's grandfather
 Shiva Kavitha / Caroline Hiltrud as Bhavani Neelakandan – Neelakandan's wife; Shiva and Aishwarya's mother; Jr. Aishwarya's grandmother
 Ananthan as Godhandapani – Neelakandan's brother; Valli's husband; Ram and Lakshmanan's father
 Karthiga as Valli Godhandapani – Godhandapani's wife; Ram and Lakshmanan's mother
 Deepan as Ram Godhandapani – Valli and Godhandapani's elder son; Lakshmanan's brother
 Domnick Nithies as Lakshmanan Godhandapani – Valli and Godhandapani's younger son; Ram's brother
 Issac Varghese as Somasundaram – Devagi's husband; Elangovan and Sahana's father; Jr. Aishwarya and Karthika's grandfather
 Meenakshi as Devagi Somasundaram – Somasundaram's wife; Elangovan and Sahana's mother; Jr. Aishwarya and Karthika's grandmother
 Karthik Sasidharan / Vijay lokesh / Bhalakhoumhar as Elangovan Somasundaram – Somasundaram and Devagi's son; Sahana's brother; Nithya's husband; Karthika's father
 Adhitri Dinesh / Subathra as Nithya Elangovan – Elangovan's wife; Karthika's mother
 Baby Nazriya as Karthika Elangovan – Elangovan and Nithya's daughter
 Rithieshvar as Karthick – Shiva's adopted brother
 Ragava Sabari as Suruttai – Shiva's friend
 Mounika Devi as Mithra
 Venkatesan as Rathnam – Dakshayani's assistant
 Birla Bose as Vanavarayan – Dakshayani's arch-rival; Manjula's husband; Amritha's father
 Devi Teju as Manjula Vanavarayan – Vanavarayan's wife; Amrita's mother
 Deepabalu as Amirtha Vanavarayan – Vanavarayan and Manjula's daughter
 Vijaya Patti as Vanavarayan's mother
 Rajesh as Parattai – Shiva's friend
 Soundar as Kannadhasan aka Tamil – A Tamil teacher
 Gemini Manikandan as Vetri
 Vishnukanth as Selvam
 Ragava Sabari as Suruttai – Shiva's friend
 Srinidhi Sudharshan as Ramya – Sahana's friend
 Mahesh Prabha as Vignesh – a police Officer
 Syed Aneesh as Rajkumar – Aishwarya's ex-fiancé

Special Appearances
 Jay Srinivas Kumar as Parthasarathy
 Dr. Nithuchandra Duraisamy as Niranjana (Dead) 
 Robo Shankar as Himself
 Raksha Holla as Shankari – English Teacher
 Aarthi as Aarthi – Sahana and Elangovan's cousin
 Seethalakshmi Hariharan as Priya Saravanan – Sahana's friend; Saravanan's wife
 VJ Pappu as Saravanan – Priya's husband
 Anandrafee as Manmadhan – Priya's cousin
 Jeevitha as Mallika – Commissioner of Police
 VJ Saravana Kumar as Deepak
 Nancy Jennifer as Anitha – Shiva's cousin 
 Durgaa as Geetha – Shiva's cousin
 VJ Aadhavan as Himself
 Niharikka Rajesh as Meera – Shiva's student girl
 Amit Bhargav as Velu
 Sameer Ahamathu as DCP Suryakumar Sivaraman Zamindar – An inspiring police officer; Kayal's husband; Shiva's family friend (Mahasangamam with Sillunu Oru Kaadhal)
 Darshini Gowda as Kayalvizhi "Kayal" Suryakumar Zamindar – A teenager; Surya's wife; Sahana's friend

Special episodes and Crossovers 
Idhayathai Thirudathe kalyana kondattam was telecasted for 2 and half hours on 19 April 2021.
Idhayathai Thirudathe has cross over episodes with Sillunu Oru Kaadhal serial from 10 May 2021 to 9 July2021

Adaptations

References

External links 
 

Colors Tamil original programming
Tamil-language romance television series
2020 Tamil-language television series debuts
Tamil-language television shows
2022 Tamil-language television series endings
Tamil-language television series based on Marathi-language television series